Sound of Fire is the debut studio album by American pop rock band This Century, released on April 19, 2011 on Action Theory Records. It spawned one single and music video for the title track "Sound of Fire".

Track listing

Personnel
Members
 Joel Kanitz - Vocals
 Sean Silverman - Guitar
 Alex Silverman - Bass, keyboard
 Ryan Gose - Drums

Production
 Tim Pagnotta - Producer
 Carlos De La Garza - Engineer
 Brandon Belsky - Additional Engineer
 Kyle Black - Additional Engineer
 Mark Needham - Mixer
 Justin Smith - Master
 Tanner Radcliffe - Artist Management
 Tim Kirch - Artist Management
 Joel Kanitz - Art Direction and Design
 Dirk Mai - Photography

References

External links 
 iTunes | Sound of Fire
 Spotify | Sound of Fire
 
 Youtube

2011 debut albums